Lepidogma latifasciata is a species of snout moth in the genus Lepidogma. It was originally described, by Wileman in 1911, under the noctuid genus Eulocastra. It is known from Hondo, and Yoshino, Japan.

References

Moths described in 1911
Epipaschiinae
Moths of Japan